The canton of Aubenas-1 is an administrative division of the Ardèche department, southern France. It was created at the French canton reorganisation which came into effect in March 2015. Its seat is in Aubenas.

It consists of the following communes:
 
Aizac
Aubenas (partly)
Genestelle
Juvinas
Labastide-sur-Bésorgues
Labégude
Lachamp-Raphaël
Laviolle
Mézilhac
Saint-Andéol-de-Vals
Saint-Joseph-des-Bancs
Saint-Julien-du-Serre
Ucel
Vallées-d'Antraigues-Asperjoc
Vals-les-Bains

References

Cantons of Ardèche